Times Beacon Record Newspapers is a community newspaper publisher, located in Setauket, NY, consisting of seven different weekly newspapers serving Suffolk County localities on the North Shore of Long Island spanning from the town of Huntington into Wading River.  The current publisher is Leah S. Dunaief.

Newspaper editions 

 The Times of Huntington, covering Huntington, Huntington Bay, Greenlawn, Halesite, Lloyd Harbor, Lloyd Neck and Cold Spring Harbor
 The Times of Northport and East Northport, covering Northport, East Northport, Fort Salonga - West, Eaton's Neck, Asharoken and Centerport
 The Times of Smithtown Township, covering Smithtown, Nesconset, Hauppauge, St. James, Nissequogue, Head of the Harbor, The Branch, San Remo, Kings Park, Fort Salonga - East, and Commack
 The Village Times Herald, covering Setauket, East Setauket, Stony Brook and Stony Brook University, Old Field, South Setauket, Poquott and Strong's Neck
 The Port Times Record, providing coverage of Port Jefferson, Port Jefferson Station, Terryville and Belle Terre
 The Times of Middle Country, covering Selden, Centereach and Lake Grove
 The Village Beacon Record, covering Mount Sinai, Miller Place, Sound Beach, Rocky Point, Shoreham, Wading River and Leisure Country

References

External links

Newspapers published in New York (state)
Long Island